Spring Valley School may refer to:

In India
Spring Valley School (Chathamangalam)

In the United States
Spring Valley School District 120 Building, Spring Valley, Arkansas
Spring Valley School (Larkspur, Colorado)
Spring Valley School (Polk County, Oregon), listed on the National Register of Historic Places

See also
Spring Valley High School (disambiguation)
Spring Valley (disambiguation)